The 6th Arunachal Pradesh Legislative Assembly election was held in October 1999. The Indian National Congress won 53 out of 60 seats and Mukut Mithi became the new Chief Minister, replacing Gegong Apang.

Results

Results by constituency

References 

Arunachal Pradesh
State Assembly elections in Arunachal Pradesh
1990s in Arunachal Pradesh